John Smith (baptized 6 January 1580 – 21 June 1631) was an English soldier, explorer, colonial governor, admiral of New England, and author. He played an important role in the establishment of the colony at Jamestown, Virginia, the first permanent English settlement in North America, in the early 17th century. He was a leader of the Virginia Colony between September 1608 and August 1609, and he led an exploration along the rivers of Virginia and the Chesapeake Bay, during which he became the first English explorer to map the Chesapeake Bay area. Later, he explored and mapped the coast of New England. He was knighted for his services to Sigismund Báthory, Prince of Transylvania, and his friend Mózes Székely.

Jamestown was established on May 14, 1607. Smith trained the first settlers to work at farming and fishing, thus saving the colony from early devastation. He publicly stated, "He that will not work, shall not eat", alluding to 2 Thessalonians 3:10. Harsh weather, a lack of food and water, the surrounding swampy wilderness, and attacks from Native Americans almost destroyed the colony. With Smith's leadership, however, Jamestown survived and eventually flourished. Smith was forced to return to England after being injured by an accidental explosion of gunpowder in a canoe.

Smith's books and maps were important in encouraging and supporting English colonization of the New World. Having named the region of New England, he stated: "Here every man may be master and owner of his owne labour and land. ...If he have nothing but his hands, he may...by industries quickly grow rich." Smith died in London in 1631.

Early life

Smith's exact birth date is unclear. He was baptized on 6 January 1580 at Willoughby, near Alford, Lincolnshire, where his parents rented a farm from Lord Willoughby. He claimed descent from the ancient Smith family of Cuerdley, Lancashire, and was educated at King Edward VI Grammar School, Louth, from 1592 to 1595.

Smith set off to sea at age 16 after his father died. He served as a mercenary in the army of Henry IV of France against the Spaniards, fighting for Dutch independence from King Philip II of Spain. He then went to the Mediterranean where he engaged in trade and piracy, and later fought against the Ottoman Turks in the Long Turkish War. He was promoted to a cavalry captain while fighting for the Austrian Habsburgs in Hungary in the campaign of Michael the Brave in 1600 and 1601. After the death of Michael the Brave, he fought for Radu Șerban in Wallachia against Ottoman vassal Ieremia Movilă.

Smith reputedly killed and beheaded three Ottoman challengers in single-combat duels, for which he was knighted by the Prince of Transylvania and given a horse and a coat of arms showing three Turks' heads. However, in 1602 he was wounded in a skirmish with the Crimean Tatars, captured, and sold as a slave. He claimed that his master was a Turkish nobleman who sent him as a gift to his Greek mistress in Constantinople, Charatza Tragabigzanda, who fell in love with Smith. He then was taken to the Crimea, where he escaped from Ottoman lands into Muscovy, then on to the Polish–Lithuanian Commonwealth before travelling through Europe and North Africa, returning to England in 1604.

In Jamestown

In 1606, Smith became involved with the Virginia Company of London's plan to colonize Virginia for profit, and King James had already granted a charter. The expedition set sail in the Discovery, the Susan Constant, and the Godspeed on 20 December 1606. His page was a 12-year-old boy named Samuel Collier.

During the voyage, Smith was charged with mutiny, and Captain Christopher Newport (in charge of the three ships) had planned to execute him. These events happened approximately when the expedition stopped in the Canary Islands for resupply of water and provisions. Smith was under arrest for most of the trip. However, they landed at Cape Henry on 26 April 1607 and unsealed orders from the Virginia Company designating Smith as one of the leaders of the new colony, thus sparing him from the gallows.

By the summer of 1607, the colonists were still living in temporary housing. The search for a suitable site ended on 14 May 1607 when Captain Edward Maria Wingfield, president of the council, chose the Jamestown site as the location for the colony. After the four-month ocean trip, their food stores were sufficient only for each to have a cup or two of grain-meal per day, and someone died almost every day due to swampy conditions and widespread disease. By September, more than 60 had died of the 104 who left England.

In early January 1608, nearly 100 new settlers arrived with Captain Newport on the First Supply, but the village was set on fire through carelessness. That winter, the James River froze over, and the settlers were forced to live in the burned ruins. During this time, they wasted much of the three months that Newport and his crew were in port loading their ships with iron pyrite (fool's gold). Food supplies ran low, although the Native Americans brought some food, and Smith wrote that "more than half of us died". Smith spent the following summer exploring Chesapeake Bay waterways and producing a map that was of great value to Virginia explorers for more than a century.

In October 1608, Newport brought a second shipment of supplies along with 70 new settlers, including the first women. Some German, Polish, and Slovak craftsmen also arrived, but they brought no food supplies. Newport brought a list of counterfeit Virginia Company orders which angered Smith greatly. One of the orders was to crown Indian leader Powhatan emperor and give him a fancy bedstead. The Company wanted Smith to pay for Newport's voyage with pitch, tar, sawed boards, soap ashes, and glass.

After that, Smith tried to obtain food from the local Indians, but it required threats of military force for them to comply. Smith discovered that there were those among both the settlers and the Indians who were planning to take his life, and he was warned about the plan by Pocahontas. He called a meeting and threatened those who were not working "that he that will not work shall not eat." After that, the situation improved and the settlers worked with more industry.

Encounter with the Powhatan tribe

Native Americans led by Opechancanough captured Smith in December 1607 while he was seeking food along the Chickahominy River, and they took him to meet Chief Powhatan (Opechancanough's older brother) at Werowocomoco, the main village of the Powhatan Confederacy. The village was on the north shore of the York River about 15 miles north of Jamestown and 25 miles downstream from where the river forms from the Pamunkey River and the Mattaponi River at West Point, Virginia. Smith was removed to the hunters' camp, where Opechancanough and his men feasted him and otherwise treated him like an honoured guest. Protocol demanded that Opechancanough inform Chief Powhatan of Smith's capture, but the paramount chief also was on a hunt and therefore unreachable. Absent interpreters or any other means of effectively interviewing the Englishman, Opechancanough summoned his seven highest-ranking kwiocosuk, or shamans, and convened an elaborate, three-day divining ritual to determine whether Smith's intentions were friendly. Finding it a good time to leave camp, Opechancanough took Smith and went in search of his brother, at one point visiting the Rappahannock tribe who had been attacked by a European ship captain a few years earlier.

In 1860, Boston businessman and historian Charles Deane was the first scholar to question specific details of Smith's writings. Smith's version of events is the only source and scepticism has increasingly been expressed about its veracity. One reason for such doubt is that, despite having published two earlier books about Virginia, Smith's earliest surviving account of his rescue by Pocahontas dates from 1616, nearly 10 years later, in a letter entreating Queen Anne to treat Pocahontas with dignity. The time gap in publishing his story raises the possibility that Smith may have exaggerated or invented the event to enhance Pocahontas' image. However, professor Leo Lemay of the University of Delaware points out that Smith's earlier writing was primarily geographical and ethnographic in nature and did not dwell on his personal experiences; hence, there was no reason for him to write down the story until this point.

Henry Brooks Adams attempted to debunk Smith's claims of heroism. He said that Smith's recounting of the story of Pocahontas had been progressively embellished, made up of "falsehoods of an effrontery seldom equaled in modern times". There is consensus among historians that Smith tended to exaggerate, but his account is consistent with the basic facts of his life. Some have suggested that Smith believed that he had been rescued, when he had in fact been involved in a ritual intended to symbolize his death and rebirth as a member of the tribe. David A. Price notes in Love and Hate in Jamestown that this is purely speculation, since little is known of Powhatan rituals and there is no evidence for any similar rituals among other Native American tribes. Smith told a similar story in True Travels (1630) of having been rescued by the intervention of a young girl after being captured in 1602 by Turks in Hungary. Karen Kupperman suggests that he "presented those remembered events from decades earlier" when telling the story of Pocahontas. Whatever really happened, the encounter initiated a friendly relationship between the Native Americans and colonists near Jamestown. As the colonists expanded farther, some of the tribes felt that their lands were threatened, and conflicts arose again.

In 1608, Pocahontas is said to have saved Smith a second time. Chief Powhatan invited Smith and some other colonists to Werowocomoco on friendly terms, but Pocahontas came to the hut where they were staying and warned them that Powhatan was planning to kill them. They stayed on their guard and the attack never came. Also in 1608, Polish craftsmen were brought to the colony to help it develop. Smith wrote that two Poles rescued him when he was attacked by an Algonquian tribesman.

Smith's explorations of the Chesapeake Bay
In the summer of 1608, Smith left Jamestown to explore the Chesapeake Bay region and search for badly needed food, covering an estimated 3,000 miles. These explorations are commemorated in the Captain John Smith Chesapeake National Historic Trail, established in 2006. In his absence, Smith left his friend Matthew Scrivener as governor in his place, a young gentleman adventurer from Sibton Suffolk who was related by marriage to the Wingfield family, but he was not capable of leading the people. Smith was elected president of the local council in September 1608.

Influx of settlers
Some of the settlers eventually wanted Smith to abandon Jamestown, but he refused. Some deserted to the Indian villages, but Powhatan's people also followed Smith's law of "he who works not, eats not". This lasted "till they were near starved indeed", in Smith's words, and they returned home.

In the spring of 1609, Jamestown was beginning to prosper, with many dwellings built, acres of land cleared, and much other work done. Then in April, they experienced an infestation of rats, along with dampness which destroyed all their stored corn. They needed food badly and Smith sent a large group of settlers to fish and others to gather shellfish downriver. They came back without food and were willing enough to take the meager rations offered them. This angered Smith and he ordered them to trade their guns and tools for fruit from the Indians and ordered everyone to work or be banished from the fort.

The weeks-long emergency was relieved by the arrival of an unexpected ship captained by Samuel Argall. He had items of food and wine which Smith bought on credit. Argall also brought news that the Virginia Company of London was being reorganized and was sending more supplies and settlers to Jamestown, along with Lord De la Warr to become the new governor.

In a May 1609 voyage to Virginia, Virginia Company treasurer Sir Thomas Smith arranged for about 500 colonists to come along, including women and children. A fleet of nine ships set sail. One sank in a storm soon after leaving the harbour, and the Sea Venture wrecked on the Bermuda Islands with flotilla admiral Sir George Somers aboard. They finally made their way to Jamestown in May 1610 after building the Deliverance and Patience to take most of the passengers and crew of the Sea Venture off Bermuda, with the new governor Thomas Gates on board.

In August 1609, Smith was quite surprised to see more than 300 new settlers arrive, which did not go well for him. London was sending new settlers with no real planning or logistical support. Then in May 1610, Somers and Gates finally arrived with 150 people from the Sea Venture. Gates soon found that there was not enough food to support all in the colony and decided to abandon Jamestown. As their boats were leaving the Jamestown area, they met a ship carrying the new governor Lord De la Warr, who ordered them back to Jamestown. Somers returned to Bermuda with the Patience to gather more food for Jamestown but died there. The Patience then sailed for England instead of Virginia, captained by his nephew.

Smith was severely injured by a gunpowder explosion in his canoe, and he sailed to England for treatment in mid-October 1609. He never returned to Virginia. Colonists continued to die from various illnesses and disease, with an estimated 150 surviving that winter out of 500 residents. The Virginia Company, however, continued to finance and transport settlers to sustain Jamestown. For the next five years, Governors Gates and Sir Thomas Dale continued to keep strict discipline, with Sir Thomas Smith in London attempting to find skilled craftsmen and other settlers to send.

New England

In 1614, Smith returned to America in a voyage to the coasts of Maine and Massachusetts Bay. He named the region "New England". The commercial purpose was to take whales for fins and oil and to seek out mines of gold or copper, but both of these proved impractical so the voyage turned to collecting fish and furs to defray the expense. Most of the crew spent their time fishing, while Smith and eight others took a small boat on a coasting expedition during which he traded rifles for 11,000 beaver skins and 100 each of martins and otters.

Smith collected a ship's cargo worth of "Furres… traine Oile and Cor-fish" and returned to England. The expedition's second vessel under the command of Thomas Hunt stayed behind and captured a number of Indians as slaves, including Squanto of the Patuxet. Smith was convinced that Hunt's actions were directed at him; by inflaming the local population, Smith said, he could "prevent that intent I had to make a plantation there", keeping the country in "obscuritie" so that Hunt and a few merchants could monopolize it. According to Smith, Hunt had taken his maps and notes of the area to defeat's Smith's settlement plans. He could not believe that Hunt was driven by greed since there was "little private gaine" to be gotten; Hunt "sold those silly Salvages for Rials of eight."

Smith published a map in 1616 based on the expedition which was the first to bear the label "New England", though the Indian place names were replaced by the names of English cities at the request of Prince Charles. The settlers of Plymouth Colony adopted the name that Smith gave to that area, and other place names on the map survive today, such as the Charles River (marked as The River Charles) and Cape Ann (Cape Anna).

Smith made two attempts in 1614 and 1615 to return to the same coast. On the first trip, a storm dismasted his ship. In the second attempt, he was captured by French pirates off the coast of the Azores. He escaped after weeks of captivity and made his way back to England, where he published an account of his two voyages as A Description of New England. He remained in England for the rest of his life.

Smith compared his experiences in Virginia with his observations of New England and offered a theory of why some English colonial projects had failed. He noted that the French had been able to monopolize trade in a very short time, even in areas nominally under English control. The people inhabiting the coasts from Maine to Cape Cod had "large corne fields, and great troupes of well proportioned people", but the French had obtained everything that they had to offer in trade within six weeks. This was due to the fact that the French had created a great trading network which they could exploit, and the English had not cultivated these relations. Where once there was inter-tribal warfare, the French had created peace in the name of the fur trade. Former enemies such as the Massachuset and the Abenaki "are all friends, and have each trade with other, so farre as they have society on each others frontiers."

Smith believed that it was too late to reverse this reality even with diplomacy, and that what was needed was military force. He suggested that English adventurers should rely on his own experience in wars around the world and his experience in New England where his few men could engage in "silly encounters" without injury or long term hostility. He also compared the experience of the Spaniards in determining how many armed men were necessary to effect Indian compliance.

Death and burial
John Smith died on 21 June 1631 in London. He was buried in 1633 in the south aisle of Saint Sepulchre-without-Newgate Church, Holborn Viaduct, London. The church is the largest parish church in the City of London, dating from 1137. Captain Smith is commemorated in the south wall of the church by a stained glass window.

Legacy

New Hampshire

The Captain John Smith Monument currently lies in disrepair off the coast of New Hampshire on Star Island, part of the Isles of Shoals. The original monument was built in 1864 to commemorate the 250th anniversary of Smith's visit to what he named Smith's Isles. It was a series of square granite slabs atop one another, with a small granite pillar at the top (see image at right). The pillar featured three carved faces, representing the severed heads of three Turks that Smith lopped off in combat during his stint as a soldier in Transylvania.

In 1914, the New Hampshire Society of Colonial Wars partially restored and rededicated the monument for the 300th anniversary celebration of his visit. The monument had weathered so badly in the harsh coastal winters that the inscription in the granite had worn away. Contemporary newspapers reported dedication of "a bronze tablet" honouring Smith, and dedication of the Tucke Monument.

In 2014, a new monument honouring Smith was dedicated at Rye Harbor State Park, an 18-ton obelisk measuring "16 feet 14 inches"—in commemoration of the year 1614; —in height.

Credibility as an author

 

Many critics judge Smith's character and credibility as an author based solely on his description of Pocahontas saving his life from the hand of Powhatan. Most of the scepticism results from the differences between his narratives. His earliest text is A True Relation of Virginia, submitted for publication in 1608, the year after his experiences in Jamestown. The second was The Generall Historie of Virginia, New-England, and the Summer Isles, which was published in 1624. The publication of letters, journals, and pamphlets from the colonists was regulated by the companies that sponsored the voyage, in that the communications must go "directly to the company" because no one was to "write any letter of anything that may discourage others". Smith violated this regulation by first publishing A True Relation as an unknown author. Leo Lemay theorizes that the editor of The Generall Historie might have cut out "references to the Indians' hostility, to bickering among the leaders of Virginia Company, and to the early supposed mutiny" of Smith on the voyage to Virginia.

The Pocahontas episode is subject to the most scrutiny by critics, for it is missing from A True Relation but it does appear in The Generall Historie. According to Lemay, important evidence of Smith's credibility is the fact that "no one in Smith's day ever expressed doubt" about the story's veracity, and many people who would have known the truth "were in London in 1616 when Smith publicised the story in a letter to the queen", including Pocahontas herself.

Smith focuses heavily on Indians in all of his works concerning the New World. His relationship with the Powhatan tribe was an important factor in preserving the Jamestown colony from sharing the presumed fate of the Roanoke Colony.

Promoter of North American colonization

One of Smith's main incentives in writing about his New World experiences and observances was to promote English colonization. Lemay claims that many promotional writers sugar-coated their depictions of America in order to heighten its appeal, but he argues that Smith was not one to exaggerate the facts. He argues that Smith was very straightforward with his readers about both the dangers and the possibilities of colonization. Instead of proclaiming that there was an abundance of gold in the New World, as many writers did, Smith illustrated that there was abundant monetary opportunity in the form of industry. Lemay argues that no motive except wealth would attract potential colonists away from "their ease and humours at home". "Therefore, he presented in his writings actual industries that could yield significant capital within the New World: fishing, farming, shipbuilding, and fur trading".

Smith insists, however, that only hard workers would be able to reap the benefits of wealth which the New World afforded. He did not understate the dangers and toil associated with colonization. He declared that only those with a strong work ethic would be able to "live and succeed in America" in the face of such dangers.

Additional works
A Map of Virginia is focused centrally on the observations that Smith made about the Native Americans, particularly regarding their religion and government. This specific focus would have been Smith's way of adapting to the New World by assimilating the best parts of their culture and incorporating them into the colony. A Map of Virginia was not just a pamphlet discussing the observations that Smith made, but also a map which Smith had drawn himself, to help make the Americas seem more domestic. As Lemay remarks, "maps tamed the unknown, reduced it to civilisation and harnessed it for Western consciousness," promoting Smith's central theme of encouraging the settlement of America. Many "naysayers of the late nineteenth and early twentieth century" have made the argument that Smith's maps were not reliable because he "lacked a formal education in cartography". That allegation, however, was proved false by the fact that Smith was a "master in his chosen fields of experience".

The Proceedings of the English Colony In Virginia was a compilation of other writings; it narrates the colony's history from December 1609 to the summer of 1610, and Smith left the colony in October 1609 due to a gunpowder accident. The writing style of The Proceedings is thought to be better constructed than A Map of Virginia.

In popular culture

John Smith was honoured on two of the three stamps of the Jamestown Exposition Issue held 26 April – 1 December 1907 at Norfolk, Virginia to commemorate the founding of the Jamestown settlement. The 1-cent John Smith, inspired by the Simon de Passe engraving of the explorer was used for the 1-cent postcard rate. The 2-cent Jamestown landing stamp paid the first-class domestic rate. 

Captain Smith has featured in popular media several times during the 20th and 21st century.
 Smith was portrayed by Anthony Dexter in the 1953 independent low-budget film Captain John Smith and Pocahontas.
 A fictionalized version of Smith appears in James A. Michener's 1978 novel Chesapeake.
 Smith is one of the main characters in Disney's 1995 animated film Pocahontas and its 1998 straight-to-video sequel Pocahontas II: Journey to a New World. He is voiced by Mel Gibson in the first movie and by his younger brother Donal Gibson in the sequel.
 Smith and Pocahontas are central characters in the 2005 Terrence Malick film The New World, in which he was portrayed by Colin Farrell.
 Country singer Blake Shelton played the Disney version in an unaired "Cut for Time" sketch on Saturday Night Live.
 In A Different Flesh by Harry Turtledove, an anthology set in an alternate timeline where the New World is inhabited by Homo erectus and Pleistocene megafauna, John Smith is mentioned as having been killed by 'sims' shortly after the establishment of Jamestown in Virginia.

Publications
John Smith published eight volumes during his life. The following lists the first edition of each volume and the pages on which it is reprinted in :

  Quarto. . First attributed to "a Gentleman of the said Collony." then to "Th. Watson" and finally (in 1615) to Smith. A digitized version is hosted at Project Jamestown. Another was prepared for the etext library of the University of Virginia.
  Quarto. Edited by W[illiam] S[immonds].
  Quarto.  This volume was translated into German and published in Frankfurt in 1617. A digitized copy is hosted by the Digital Commons of the University of Nebraska–Lincoln.
  Quarto. . This volume contained some of the material from A Description of New-England. A new and somewhat expanded "second edition" was printed in 1622, also by William Jones. 
  Folio. . The work was republished in 1726, 1727 and 1732.
  Octavo. . In the following year the work was enlarged probably by another hand as  That same year another printing of An Accidence was also made for Jonas Man and Benjamin Fisher. In 1653 this work, under the title A Sea Grammar, was entirely recast and substantially enlarged by "B.F."
  Folio. .
  Quarto. .

See also
 Jamestown Exposition
 Southern Colonies

References

Citations

General and cited sources 
  Hosted online by the Internet Archive: Volume I and Volume II.
 
 
  The original imprint was "In fower parts, each containing five bookes." All four volumes are hosted online by the Library of Congress
A digitized version can be downloaded from The Digital Commons at University of Nebraska–Lincoln.
 
 . Macmillan published a verbatim version of the first printing (with different pagination) of this work as well as Smith's 1630 autobiography and his Sea Grammar:  The Macmillan version, is hosted by the Library of Congress (in two volumes): Volume I and Volume II. A searchable version (with various download options) of the same book is hosted by the Internet Archive: Voume I and Volume II. The work was twice republished in Smith's life (in 1726 and 1727) and immediately after his death (in 1732).

Further reading
 Barbour, Philip L. (1964). The Three Worlds of Captain John Smith Boston: Houghton Mifflin 
 Barbour, Philip L. (1969). The Jamestown Voyages under the First Charter, 1606–1609, 2 vols., Publications of the Hakluyt Society, ser. 2, 136–137. Cambridge: Cambridge University Press
 
 
 
 Horn, James, ed. (2007). Captain John Smith, Writings, with Other Narratives of Roanoke, Jamestown, and the English Settlement of America. Library of America. .
 
 
 
 
 
 
 Smith, John. The Complete Works of Captain John Smith (1580–1631) in Three Volumes, edited by Philip L. Barbour, 3 vols. (Chapel Hill: University of North Carolina Press for The Institute of Early American History and Culture, Williamsburg, 1986)
 Smith, John. The Generall Historie of Virginia, New-England, and the Summer Isles. 1624. Repr. in Jamestown Narratives, ed. Edward Wright Haile. Champlain, VA: Roundhouse, 1998. pp. 198–199, 259.
 Smith, John. Letter to Queen Anne. 1616. Repr. as 'John Smith's Letter to Queen Anne regarding Pocahontas'. Caleb Johnson's Mayflower Web Pages. 1997. Accessed 23 April 2006.
 Striker, Laura Polanyi; Smith, Bradford. "The Rehabilitation of John Smith". The Journal of Southern History, Vol. 28, 4 Nov. (Nov. 1962) pp. 474–481.
 Symonds, William. The Proceedings of the English Colonie in Virginia. 1612. Repr. in The Complete Works of Captain John Smith. Ed. Philip L. Barbour. Chapel Hill: University of North Carolina Press, 1986. Vol. 1, pp. 251–252
 Warner, Charles Dudley, Captain John Smith, 1881. Repr. in Captain John Smith, Project Gutenberg Text, accessed 4 July 2006

External links

 Captain John Smith Chesapeake National Historic Trail Official Website
 NGS Then and Now – John Smith
  John Smith Water Trail Blog
  The Captain John Smith Water Trail
 A Description of New England (1616) online text (PDF)
 The Ugliest Monument in New England (seacoastnh.com)
 John Smith Memorial Photo History
 Complete text of the Generall Historie American Memory
 Texts of Imagination & Empire, by Emily Rose, Princeton University Folger Shakespeare Library
 
 
 

1580 births
1631 deaths
English explorers
17th-century explorers
17th-century American writers
17th-century English male writers
17th-century soldiers
Slaves in the Ottoman Empire
Colonial governors of Virginia
English explorers of North America
People educated at King Edward VI Grammar School, Louth
English duellists
People from Alford, Lincolnshire
Writers of captivity narratives
English soldiers
Jamestown, Virginia
Slaves from the Kingdom of England
Explorers of the United States
People from Jamestown, Virginia
17th-century slaves
Military personnel from Lincolnshire
English emigrants